St. Agnes Cathedral is a Christian church located in Kyoto, Japan, and is the diocesan cathedral of the Diocese of Kyoto, which comprises all the Anglican-Episcopal churches and other facilities in Fukui, Ishikawa, Kyoto, and Toyama Prefectures.

General
St. Agnes Cathedral was built as Holy Trinity Church in 1898 on the campus of Heian Women's University, but changed its name to St. Agnes Church in 1923.

The red brick, Gothic Revival church was designed by American architect James McDonald Gardiner. The cathedral is one of the oldest Christian church structures in Kyoto and was designated as one of the cultural heritage buildings of Kyoto City in 1985.

See also
 Anglican Church in Japan
 Anglican Communion
 St. Andrew's Cathedral, Tokyo
 St. Andrew's Cathedral (Yokohama)

References

External links
 St. Agnes Anglican International Church of Kyoto
 NSKK St. Agnes Cathedral, Kyoto
 Heian Women's University

Buildings and structures in Kyoto
Anglican cathedrals in Japan
Anglican church buildings in Japan
Buildings of the Meiji period
Religious buildings and structures in Kyoto Prefecture
Anglican Church in Japan
Churches completed in 1898
19th-century Anglican church buildings
19th-century churches in Japan